The Alpena and Northern Railroad is a defunct railroad which operated briefly in northern Michigan during the 1890s.

The company incorporated on July 28, 1893, with the intention of building an  line from Alpena to Mackinaw City, on the south shore of the Straits of Mackinac.

On April 16, 1895, the A&N was bought by the Detroit & Mackinac and ceased to exist as an independent company.

Notes

References 

Railway companies established in 1893
Railway companies disestablished in 1895
Defunct Michigan railroads
1893 establishments in Michigan
American companies established in 1893
1895 mergers and acquisitions
1895 disestablishments in Michigan